Archibald McDonald (April 16, 1849 – February 22, 1933) was a general merchant and political figure in British Columbia. He represented Lillooet in the Legislative Assembly of British Columbia from 1903 to 1907 and from 1909 to 1924 as a Conservative.

He was born at Ste-Anne-de-Prescott, Ontario in 1849, the son of Archibald McDonald and Catherine Cattanach, and educated at Carillon Academy near Hawkesbury. In 1887, McDonald married Lillian MacMillan. He was president of McDonald and McGillivray Ltd. in Clinton. His election in 1903 was declared void, but he defeated David Alexander Stoddart to win the subsequent by-election held in 1904. McDonald was defeated by Mark Robert Eagleson when he ran for reelection in 1907, then defeated Eagleson in 1909 and was reelected in 1912, 1916 and 1920. He died on February 22, 1933.

References 

1849 births
1933 deaths
British Columbia Conservative Party MLAs